Cognitive metaphor refers to certain kinds of metaphors.
 The same as a Conceptual metaphor in cognitive science
 An approach to an Interface metaphor in computing